Thomas Brown was an English professional footballer who played as an inside forward for Sunderland.

References

Footballers from Sunderland
English footballers
Association football inside forwards
Sunderland A.F.C. players
St Mirren F.C. players
Hamilton Academical F.C. players
English Football League players
Year of birth missing
Year of death missing